Blood Assurance is a non-profit organization designed to provide blood to surrounding hospitals of the Chattanooga, Tennessee, North Georgia, Alabama, Southwest Virginia, and North Carolina areas.

Their headquarters is on East 4th Street in Chattanooga.

History 

Blood Assurance was founded in 1972 by the Chattanooga–Hamilton County Medical Society, Chattanooga Area Hospital Council, and Chattanooga Jaycees; it serves more than 70 health care facilities in 47 counties in 5 states. Blood Assurance is a member of the American Association of Blood Banks, America's Blood Banks, Blood Centers of America, the Tennessee Association of Blood Banks, the Tennessee Hospital Association, the Chattanooga Area Hospital Council, the Tennessee Department of Health, and the Georgia Department of Community Health. The organization is licensed by the Alabama State Board of Health, the Georgia Department of Human Resources, the Tennessee Department of Public Health and the U.S. Food and Drug Administration (FDA).

Locations 
As of May 2014, there are 13 donation centers and 13 bloodmobiles.
 Cartersville, Georgia
 Dalton, Georgia
 Fort Oglethorpe, Georgia
 Rome, Georgia
 Chattanooga, Tennessee (three locations)
 Cleveland, Tennessee
 Cookeville, Tennessee
 Hixson, Tennessee
 Johnson City, Tennessee
 Tullahoma, Tennessee
 Abingdon, Virginia
 Bristol, Virginia

Facilities served 
The following facilities are listed as being serviced by Blood Assurance.

Alabama 
 Cherokee Medical Center, Centre
 DeKalb Regional Medical Center, Fort Payne
 Highlands Medical Center, Scottsboro

Georgia 

 
 Union General Hospital, Blairsville
 Fannin Regional Hospital, Blue Ridge
 Gordon Hospital, Calhoun
 Cartersville Medical Center, Cartersville
 Polk Medical Center, Cedartown
 Murray Medical Center, Chatsworth
 Hamilton Medical Center, Dalton
 North Georgia Medical Center, Ellijay
 
 Hutcheson Medical Center, Fort Oglethorpe
 DCI - Fort Oglethorpe, Fort Oglethorpe
 Chatuge Regional Hospital, Hiawassee
 DCI – LaFayette, LaFayette
 Floyd Medical Center, Rome
 Redmond Regional Medical Center, Rome
 Wildwood Hospital, Wildwood

North Carolina 
 Erlanger Western Carolina Hospital, Murphy

Tennessee 

 Cumberland River Hospital, Celina
 Erlanger Health System, Chattanooga
 Erlanger North Hospital, Chattanooga
 Memorial Hospital, Chattanooga
 Parkridge East Hospital, Chattanooga
 Parkridge Medical Center, Chattanooga
 Children's Hospital at Erlanger, Chattanooga
 Chattanooga Kidney Center, Chattanooga
 Chattanooga Kidney Center – North, Chattanooga
 DCI – Lyerly, Chattanooga
 DCI - S. Broad, Chattanooga
 DCI - Third Street, Chattanooga
 HealthSouth Chattanooga Rehab, Chattanooga
 HealthSouth Surgery Center, Chattanooga
 Kindred Hospital, Chattanooga
 
 Physician's Surgery Center, Chattanooga
 Tennova Healthcare, Clarksville
 Sky Ridge Medical Center, Cleveland
 Sky Ridge Medical Center Westside Campus, Cleveland
 Kidney Center of Cleveland, Cleveland
 Maury Regional Medical Center, Columbia
 Cookeville Regional Medical Center, Cookeville
 Copper Basin Medical Center, Copperhill
 Rhea Medical Center, Dayton
 Unicoi County Medical Center, Erwin
 DCI - East Ridge, East Ridge
 Lincoln Medical Center, Fayetteville
 Williamson Medical Center, Franklin
 DCI – Hixson, Hixson
 Memorial North Park Hospital, Hixson
 Grandview Medical Center, Jasper
 DCI – Jasper, Jasper
 
 Franklin Woods Community Hospital, Johnson City
 Johnson City Medical Center, Johnson City
 Marshall Medical Center, Lewisburg
 Medical Center of Manchester, Manchester
 United Regional Medical Center, Manchester
 River Park Hospital, McMinnville
 Johnson County Community Hospital, Mountain City
 Home Care Solutions, Ooltewah
 Erlanger Bledsoe Medical Center, Pikeville
 Emerald-Hodgson Hospital, Sewanee
 DeKalb Community Hospital, Smithville
 Highlands Medical Center – Sparta, Sparta
 Harton Regional Medical Center, Tullahoma
 Southern Tennessee Medical Center, Winchester
 Stones River Hospital, Woodbury

Virginia 
 Johnston Memorial Hospital, Abingdon
 Twin County Regional Hospital, Galax
 Russell County Medical Center, Lebanon
 Smyth County Community Hospital, Marion

References

External links 
 

Blood banks in the United States
Medical and health organizations based in Tennessee